Something for the Weekend is the sixth studio album by the British rock group Stackridge. It was released in the UK in October 1999 by Angel Air.

Track listing
"It's a Fascinating World" (James Warren)
"Ruth, Did You Read My Mind?" (John Miller, Warren)
"Something About the Beatles" (Warren, Sarah Menage)
"Help Under Doors" (Miller, Warren)
"The Vegans Hatred of Fish" (Crun Walter)
"Sliding Down the Razorblade of Love" (Roger Cook, Andy West)
"The Youth of Today" (Miller, Warren)
"Faith in Love" (Warren)
"Five Poster Bedlam" (Mike Evans)
"Wilderbeeste" (Miller, Warren)
"Grooving Along the Highway" (Miller, Warren, Menage)
"Someday They'll Find Out" (Warren)
"Drinking and Driving" (Walter)
"It Must Be Time for Bed" (Warren, Menage)

Personnel
Mike Evans – violin, vocals
Crun Walter – bass guitar
James Warren – vocals, guitar
John Miller – keyboards
Richard Stubbings – keyboards, vocals
Tim Robinson – drums, percussion

Additional personnel
Innes Sibun – guitar on "It's a Fascinating World"
Terry Weale – guitar on "Wildebeeste"
Steve Robinson – backing vocals on "Drinking and Driving"
Graham Smith – harmonica on "Drinking and Driving"

Production
James Warren – producer

References

Stackridge albums
1999 albums